Hurst Wickham is a village in the Mid Sussex District of West Sussex, England. It lies just off the B2116 road, 2.1 miles (3.4 km) southeast of Burgess Hill. It is in the civil parish of Hurstpierpoint and Sayers Common.

External links

Villages in West Sussex
Mid Sussex District